The bicolor cactus snail (Xerarionta tryoni) is a species of land snail in the family Helminthoglyptidae. This species is endemic to the United States.

References

Molluscs of the United States
Xerarionta
Gastropods described in 1864
Taxonomy articles created by Polbot